Pronoun avoidance is the use of kinship terms, titles and other complex nominal expressions instead of personal pronouns in speech.

Linguistics
Many languages feature the T–V distinction, where two or more different pronouns are used contextually to convey formality or familiarity.  In contrast, languages with pronoun avoidance tend to feature complex systems of honorifics and use pronoun avoidance as a form of negative politeness, instead employing expressions referring to status, relationship or title.  In these languages, second person pronouns still exist, but are used primarily to address social equals and inferiors.

Languages with pronoun avoidance cluster in South-East Asia.  For example, in Indonesian, the standard terms of respectful forms of address are Bapak (literally "father") and Ibu ("mother") for men and women respectively, and the neologism Anda was invented in the 1950s to function as a polite second-person pronoun.  Japanese, well known for its elaborate system of honorific speech, also exhibits pronoun avoidance, to such an extent that Maynard suggests that Japanese “lacks a pronominal system”.

Pronoun avoidance may extend to first and third person pronouns as well.  In Vietnamese, a set of finely graded kinship terms largely replace all pronouns, but it is also common particularly for women to refer to themselves by name, and titles are often used for third parties.

Languages featuring pronoun avoidance
The World Atlas of Language Structures characterizes the following languages as exhibiting pronoun avoidance:

 Burmese
 Indonesian
 Japanese
 Khmer
 Korean
 Thai
 Vietnamese

Autism
Children with autism-spectrum disorder (ASD) frequently exhibit pronoun reversal or pronoun avoidance, using proper names instead.  Since autistic children often have difficulty with pronouns, this phenomenon has been attributed variously to input from adults avoiding pronouns, or abnormalities in how children with ASD experience the self.

See also
 Pro-drop language, where pronouns may be omitted when they can be inferred from context
 T–V distinction
 Pronoun game

References

Linguistics
Pronouns